The 2019 European Parliament election in Denmark was held on 26 May 2019, and elected the Danish members to the European Parliament. The elections are part of the EU-wide elections for the parliament. Denmark has 13 seats in parliament, and which will be increased by one additional seat, once Brexit comes into force.

Venstre won the election, becoming the biggest party and gaining two seats. The election was a disaster for the Danish People's Party, who lost three of their four seats. Both the Social People's Party and the Social Liberals won doubles their seats from one to two. The People's Movement against the EU lost the representation in the parliament they have had since 1979.

The election were held 10 days before general elections in Denmark.

Background 
In the 2014 European Parliament election, the Danish People's Party (DPP) became the largest party, gaining 4 seats overall, and the lead candidate, Morten Messerschmidt, received 465.758 individual votes, a new record.

In October 2015, Rikke Karlson, another member of the DPP-group in the parliament, left the party due to lack of internal transparency into documents related to MELD and the associated foundation FELD. The following media attention revealed that MELD and DPP had misused EU funding, and Messerschmidt were forced to resign as leader of the parliamentary group. He was replaced by Anders Visitisen.

In December 2015, Jens Rohde, elected MEP as a member of Venstre, left the party due to discontent with the parties increasingly tougher policy on immigration, passed in cooperation with DPP. Rohde joined the Social Liberals instead. In February 2016, Ulla Tørnæs from Venstre left the parliament to become Minister for Science, Technology, Information and Higher Education. Morten Løkkegaard became the new Venstre MEP.

Parties contesting 
All parties represented in the Folketing participate in the election, in addition to the People's Movement against the EU. In previous elections, the Red-Green Alliance have declined to contest, but instead supported the People's Movement against the EU. This is the first European Parliament election that The Alternative participate in.

The Alternative is contesting the election as a member of Democracy in Europe Movement 2025, a pan-European political movement who have a common political manifest. In April 2019, DPP was among the founding members of the European Alliance of People and Nations, a new coalition who aim to create a broader nationalist group after the election. If elected, the Liberal Alliance wishes to join ALDE, and the Red-Green Alliance wishes to join GUE/NGL.

Results
Venstre became the biggest party in the election, taking 23.5% of the vote and four seats, of which one will be assigned to Denmark following Brexit. They were closely followed by the Social Democrats with 21.5% and three seats. The election was a "meltdown" for the Danish People's Party, who saw their support drop from 26.6% to 10.8%, and who lost three of the four seats they won in the last election.

Both the Socialist People's Party and the Social Liberals had a good election, and both parties saw their seats double from one to two. The latter due to their electoral alliance with The Alternative, who did not win a seat.

The Conservative People's Party managed to defend their single seat despite a smaller vote share compared to last election. The Conservative People's Party is the only Danish party that is a member of the EPP, the largest group in the European Parliament. Prior to the election, people warned that it might damage Danish interests if there were no longer any Danish parties represented in the EPP.

The People's Movement Against the EU lost their single seat, and for the first time since 1979, they are not represented in the parliament. The loss was widely regarded as caused by the Red-Green Alliance, who traditionally have supported the People's Movement, but decided to contest the election for the first time. The Red-Green Alliance won a single seat. Incumbent MEP Rina Ronja Kari reacted by saying that the movement would live on, and that "the EU-opposition is not dead".

Voter turnout were 66%, the highest ever in a Danish European Parliament election. This was unexpected, as the campaign was largely overshadowed by the general election 10 days later. A study by election scientist Kasper Møller Hansen showed that among first-time voters (18–23 years old), the turnout increased from 41,19 % in 2014 to 59,70 % in 2019. Møller Hansen ascribed the increase to a general focus on climate change and Brexit, as well educational elections held at schools since 2015.

Elected members 
The following candidates were elected to the European Parliament:

 Venstre
Morten Løkkegaard (207,558 personal votes)
Søren Gade (201,696 personal votes)
Asger Christensen (31,347 personal votes)
 Following Brexit: Linea Søgaard-Lidell (24,153 personal votes)

 Social Democrats
Jeppe Kofod (188,757 personal votes)
Christel Schaldemose (65,179 personal votes)
Niels Fuglsang (29,444 personal votes)

 Socialist People's Party
Margrete Auken (199,522 personal votes)
Kira Marie Peter-Hansen (15,765 personal votes)

 Social Liberals
Morten Helveg Petersen (97,667 personal votes)
Karen Melchior (17,292 personal votes)

 Danish People's Party
Peter Kofod (119,408 personal votes)

 Conservative
Pernille Weiss (80,140 personal votes)

 Red-Green Alliance
Nikolaj Villumsen (50,567 personal votes)

On 27 June Jeppe Kofod was appointed Minister of Foreign Affairs in the Social Democratic government formed after the general elections held on 5 June, and thus did not take his seat. The appointment was a surprise as he had just been elected, but media speculated it was due to Henrik Sass Larsen not being available as a minister. Marianne Vind is to take his seat.

Notes

References 

Denmark
European Parliament elections in Denmark
Europe